Singarasa was a local chieftain holding the title of Maha-Samantha (prince of a subjugated region), who had his headquarters at Arasikere, Hassan district, Karnataka, India, in the 12th century CE. He was a popular chieftain of his time, and several places in Karnataka are named after him, for example Singatagere (Arasikere taluk), Singanamane (Bhadravathi taluk), Singanagadde (N.R. Pura taluk) and Singasandra. Several chieftains with the same or similar names ruled various parts of Karnataka from the 10th century CE onwards.

Mahasamantha
Singarasa ruled Arasiyakere (present-day Arasikere) when Vira Ganga Bittideva was king at Dorasamudra, the capital of the Hoysala Empire. Singarasa was the son and successor of Nagavarma; Bhutarasa was Singarasa's son and successor.

Relocated to Kanakatte
An inscription dated 1132 states that Singarasa was relocated from Arasikere to Kanakatte, where he built a temple named Bettadakalideva for Shiva by installing a linga. He also built another temple, which he named Singeshwara after himself, as was the prevailing practice.

Notes

References

Bibliography

 

Year of birth missing
Year of death missing
12th-century Indian monarchs
People from Hassan district